Julie Ann McCann  is a British computer scientist who is a professor at Imperial College London. She is the leader of the Adaptive Emergent Systems Engineering. She is a Fellow of the British Computer Society and was awarded the Suffrage Science award in 2018.

Early life and education 
As a teenager, McCann became interested in electronic music, particularly listening to Kraftwerk and Karlheinz Stockhausen. She lived close to the Armagh Planetarium in Armagh. She joined Ulster University for her academic studies, working toward a bachelor's and doctorate in computer science. She completed her doctorate in 1992.

Research and career 
McCann develops spatial computing and wireless communications, which combine information from their environments with their digital components. Her group investigate convergence and anarchical spatial computing systems. To better understand this, she uses established understanding from systems beyond computing infrastructure (e.g. economics, biology, physics). She combines decentralised algorithms and protocols using low-powered sensing devices. These devices are very small and communicate with one another via radio signals.

McCann joined Imperial College London in 2002 from City, University of London. She works on Adaptive Emergent Systems Engineering. Her interests lie in harnessing the various interactions between the cyber and physical to improve performance, resilience and to make secure. She oversees the Alan Turing Institute Resilient and Robust Infrastructure challenge.

McCann leads the National Research Foundation Singapore Eco Cities initiative. McCann also serves as deputy director of the PETRAS National Centre of Excellence.

Awards and honours 
 2018 Suffrage Science award
 2022 Turing Talk

Selected publications 
Her publications include:

References 

British computer scientists
Fellows of the British Computer Society
Alumni of Imperial College London
Academics of Imperial College London
Year of birth missing (living people)
Living people